Gina (occasional variants Geena, Gena, Jeana, Jeanna) is a feminine given name, in origin a hypocoristic form of names ending in -gina (by metanalysis of the latinate feminine suffix -ina), such as Luigina, Regina or   Georgina, also of Virginia or Eugenia.

The short form was popularized in the 1950s by the actress Gina Lollobrigida (b. 1927), whose birth name is Luigina.
Lollobrigida became famous in 1953, from which year popularity of the given name Gina in the United States rose steeply, reaching a peak at rank 54 in 1967. Since the 1970s, it has declined steadily, falling below rank 1,000 in 2009.

People called Gina
Gina Apostol, Philippines-born writer
Gina Arnold, American rock critic
Gina Austin (Georgina), American model
Gina Bachauer (1913–1976), Greek classical pianist
Gina Barreca (Regina), American humorist and professor
Gina Beck, English actress and singer
Gina Bellman, British actress
Gina Birch, British punk musician, founder of The Raincoats
Gina Bold, London-born artist of Greek and Scottish background
Gina Breedlove, American singer and stage actress
Gina Carano (born 1982), American actress and mixed martial artist
Gina Cerminara, American author
Gina Choi (지나), Korean-Canadian Singer
Gina Cruz Blackledge (born 1969), Mexican politician
Geena Davis, American actress
Gina Ferris Wilkins, American novelist
Gina Ford, British writer on parenting methods
Gina Gallego, American television actress
Gina Gaston, American news presenter
Gina Gershon, American movie actress
Gina Gleason, American guitarist
Gina Glocksen, American singer
Gina Gogean, Romanian gymnast
Gina Goldberg, Finnish model, actress and singer
Gina Grant, American who was admitted to Harvard but then had her admission rescinded when it was known she had killed her mother
Gina Green, American Urban Gospel singer
Gina Guidi, American boxer
Gina Haley (Linda Georgina), American singer-songwriter
Gina Hart, American comics artist
Gina Haspel (born 1956), American intelligence officer and Director of the Central Intelligence Agency
Gina Hecht, American actress
Gina Holden, Canadian actress
Gina Jeffreys, Australian country singer
Gina Keatley, Celebrity Chef
Gina Kirschenheiter, American television personality
Gina La Piana, Hispanic-American actress and pop singer
Gina Kolata, American science journalist
Gina Krog, Norwegian suffragist and political activist
Gina La Piana, Hispanic-American actress and pop singer
Gina Liano, Australian barrister and television personality
Gina Lollobrigida, Italian actress
Gina Lopez, Filipino environmentalist and politician
Gina Mantegna, American actress
Gina Maria Adenauer, race car driver
Gina McKee, English actress
Gina Montalto (2003–2018), one of the 17 victims who was killed in the Stoneman Douglas High School shooting
Gina Nemo, American actress
Gina Pareño, Filipino-American actress
Gina Philips, American television actress
Gina Prince-Bythewood, American film director
Gina Raimondo, American politician businesswoman
Gina Ravera, American actress
Gina Riley, Australian actor, writer, singer and comedian
Gina Rinehart, chair of Hancock Prospecting
Gina Rodriguez, American actress
Gina Sanmiguel, Ecuadorian politician 
Gina Schock (Regina), drummer for The Go-Go's
Gina Sigstad, Norwegian cross-country skier
Gina Silva, American newscaster based in Los Angeles
Gina Stile, American rock guitarist
Gina Swainson, American model
Gina Tognoni, American soap opera actress
Gina Tolleson, American model
Gina Torres, American television and movie actress
Gina Tuttle, American actress and voice-over artist
Gina Wilkinson, Canadian actress, director, and playwright
Gina Yashere, British comedian
Countess Georgina von Wilczek, "Gina", Princess of Liechtenstein, the mother of Hans-Adam II, Prince of Liechtenstein
Gina, lead member of Irish pop group Gina, Dale Haze and the Champions

Pseudonym
 Gina Lynn, American pornographic actress
 Gina Wild, stage name of Michaela Schaffrath, German pornographic actress

Fictional characters
 Gina Buchanan, fictional character in the BBC Scotland soap River City
 Gina Calabrese, fictional police detective on the television series Miami Vice
 Gina Cavalli, antagonist in the video game R:Racing Evolution
 Gina Cross, fictional character in the Half-Life series of computer games
 Gina Gambarro, fictional character from the television series Ugly Betty
 Gina Gillotti, fictional character from comic strip series Dennis the Menace
 Gina Gold, fictional character in the British drama The Bill
 Gina Gray, fictional character. Wife of Michael Gray from the BBC drama Peaky Blinders
 Gina Guerra, fictional character in the video game Far Cry New Dawn
 Gina Inviere, fictional character on Battlestar Galactica
 Gina Jefferson, fictional character in Sesame Street
 Gina Kincaid, fictional character in the television series Beverly Hills 90210
 Gina Linetti, fictional character in the American television series Brooklyn Nine-Nine
 Gina Patrick, fictional character in the British soap opera Hollyoaks
 Gina Porter, fictional character in the television series High School Musical: The Musical: The Series
 Gina Roma, fictional character in the American soap opera The Young and the Restless
 Gina Rossi, fictional character in the British prison drama series Shortland Street
 Gina Russo, fictional character in the American medical drama Nip/Tuck
 Gina Von Amberg, fictional character in the American soap opera Days of Our Lives
 Gina Waters-Payne, fictional character in the American television series Martin
 Gina, a fictional engine seen in Thomas & Friends: The Great Race
Gina McClearly, identical twin sister to Leni McClearly in the Netflix miniseries Echoes

See also
 Gina (disambiguation)
 

Feminine given names
English feminine given names
Italian feminine given names